Higashi-naga-iwa Glacier is a wide glacier flowing to the sea at the eastern side of Naga-iwa Rock in Queen Maud Land, Antarctica. It was mapped from surveys and air photos by the Japanese Antarctic Research Expedition, 1957–62, and, in association with nearby Naga-iwa Rock, named "Higashi-naga-iwa-hyoga" (eastern long rock glacier).

See also
 List of glaciers in the Antarctic
 Glaciology

References

 

Glaciers of Queen Maud Land
Prince Olav Coast